John Mervin Toms (23 January 1909 – 8 October 1971) was an Australian politician who was a Labor Party member of the Legislative Assembly of Western Australia from 1956 to 1971. He was appointed Speaker of the Legislative Assembly in July 1971, but served only a few months before dying in office.

Early life
Toms was born in Boulder, Western Australia, to Lucy (née Kent) and John Pryor Toms. He moved to Perth during his childhood, attending Midland High School. Toms left school at the age of 15, initially working as a labourer and later as a carpenter and joiner. He married Winifred Ann Jenkinson in 1933, with whom he had three children. Toms was elected to the Bayswater Road Board in April 1944, and would serve on the council until May 1971, including as chairman from 1951 to 1956. He was recognised as an Honourary Freeman of the City in December 1971 due to his service on the board, and has the Mertome Village aged care complex named after him. He was also prominent in the Building Workers' Industrial Union, a forerunner of the CFMEU.

Politics
Toms entered parliament at the 1956 state election, easily winning the seat of Maylands. At the 1962 election, he transferred to the new seat of Bayswater. When Bayswater was abolished at the 1968 election, he switched seats for a second time, winning the newly created seat of Ascot. Toms was subsequently appointed deputy chairman of committees in the Legislative Assembly.

Following Labor's victory at the 1971 election, Toms was elected to the speakership. His elevation meant that the government and opposition had equal numbers on the floor of the Legislative Assembly, so he made frequent use of his casting vote as speaker. During a sitting in October 1971, Toms collapsed and was rushed to Sir Charles Gairdner Hospital, where he died. Because his death reduced Labor to a minority government, the premier, John Tonkin, advised the governor, Sir Douglas Kendrew, to prorogue parliament until the necessary by-election had been held (which Labor won).

See also
 James Lee-Steere, the only other speaker to die in office

References

1909 births
1971 deaths
Australian Labor Party members of the Parliament of Western Australia
Mayors of places in Western Australia
Members of the Western Australian Legislative Assembly
People from Boulder, Western Australia
Speakers of the Western Australian Legislative Assembly
20th-century Australian politicians
Western Australian local councillors